Harold Ray Bradley (January 2, 1926 – January 31, 2019) was an American guitarist and entrepreneur, who played on many country, rock and pop recordings and produced numerous TV variety shows and movie soundtracks. Having started as a session musician in the 1940s, he was a part of the Nashville A-Team of session players, which included pianist Floyd Cramer and pedal steel guitarist Pete Drake. He is one of the most recorded guitarists in music history.

Early life 
Bradley was born in Nashville, Tennessee, one of six children of Vernon Bradley and Letha Maie Owen in January 1926. As a child, he played tenor banjo but switched to guitar on the advice of his elder brother, record producer Owen. Owen arranged for Harold to tour with Ernest Tubb as lead guitarist in his band, The Texas Troubadours, while Harold was still in high school. After graduation, Harold joined the Navy in 1944 and was discharged in 1946, after which he attended George Peabody College (now a part of Vanderbilt University) in Nashville, studying music while accompanying Eddy Arnold and Bradley Kincaid at the Grand Ole Opry. His first session was with Pee Wee King and the Golden West Cowboys in Chicago in 1946. His debut in Nashville was four years later in 1950.

Career 
In 1954, Owen and Harold built Bradley Film and Recording Studios, later known as the Quonset Hut Studio, which was the first music industry-related business on what is now known as Music Row. Harold enjoyed frequent work as a session musician into the 1970s, performing on hundreds of albums by country stars such as Patsy Cline, Willie Nelson, Roy Orbison, Elvis Presley and Slim Whitman. He also played bass guitar on records, initiating the "tic-tac" method of bass muting. He was a member of the Nashville A-Team, which would play for such musicians as Bob Dylan, Joan Baez and The Byrds, and was inducted into the Musician's Hall of Fame in 2007. Harold recorded three albums as a pop guitarist on Columbia Records, Misty Guitar, Guitar for Lovers Only, and Bossa Nova Goes to Nashville, in the 1960s.

From 1991 to 2008, Bradley served as the President of the Nashville chapter of the American Federation of Musicians (AFM). He was also the first President of the Nashville chapter of the Recording Academy. In 1999, he was elected as the AFM International Vice-President and served until 2010. Bradley was inducted into the Country Music Hall of Fame in 2006, as his brother Owen previously had been. In 2010, Bradley was a recipient of the Trustees Award at the 52nd Grammy Awards. Bradley died at Vanderbilt University Medical Center in Nashville on January 31, 2019, twenty-nine days after his 93rd birthday. He was survived by two daughters and his wife of 66 years, Eleanor Allen Bradley. Harold's nephew Jerry, would be inducted into the Country Music Hall of Fame later in 2019.

Discography

 Bossanova Goes to Nashville (Columbia, 1963)
 Misty Guitar (Columbia, 1963)
 Guitar For Lovers Only (Columbia, 1966)
 Guitar for Sentimental Lovers (Harmony, 1972)
 Everything's Easy (2016)

With Kai Winding
Modern Country (Verve, 1964)

References

External links

 
 Harold Ray Bradley recordings at the Discography of American Historical Recordings.

1926 births
2019 deaths
American session musicians
American country guitarists
American male guitarists
Country Music Hall of Fame inductees
Members of the Country Music Association
Military personnel from Tennessee
Musicians from Nashville, Tennessee
Peabody College alumni
Pupils of Isidor Philipp
United States Navy sailors
United States Navy personnel of World War II
Guitarists from Tennessee
20th-century American guitarists
Country musicians from Tennessee
20th-century American male musicians